Ernie Bourassa is a Canadian former politician, who served as mayor of Whitehorse, Yukon from 2000 to 2006.

He was defeated by Bev Buckway in the 2006 municipal election. An insurance broker  by profession, he was subsequently appointed as president and CEO of the Yukon Chamber of Commerce.

References 

Mayors of Whitehorse
Canadian real estate agents
Living people
Franco-Yukonnais people
Year of birth missing (living people)